Philadelphia's Baltimore & Ohio Railroad station – also known as the B & O station or Chestnut Street station – was the main passenger station for the Baltimore & Ohio Railroad in Philadelphia, Pennsylvania. Designed by architect Frank Furness in 1886, it stood at 24th Street and the Chestnut Street Bridge from 1888 to 1963.

History

The B&O Railroad completed the Philadelphia Subdivision in 1886, its own line between Baltimore and Philadelphia that did not rely on Pennsylvania Railroad routes. Relying on Reading Railroad and Central Railroad of New Jersey routes between Philadelphia and Jersey City, New Jersey, (opposite New York City), the B&O could provide direct service to the New York City area.

Architecture
Mr. Frank Furness, the architect, says that the new Baltimore and Ohio depot, to be erected at Twenty-fourth and Chestnut streets will be equally as fine as the Broad Street depot. The outward appearance of the building will be striking. The architecture is Flemish. The lower wall will principally be of iron, carried on iron columns and boxes, and the upper walls will be of brick, red-stone and terra cotta. The string courses, cornices and brackets will be of terra cotta, and the roof will be covered with red tile. The appearance of the building in profile will be most picturesque.
The Philadelphia station was essentially built on stilts, with its main entrance from the Chestnut Street Bridge, 30 feet above grade level. The B&O tracks ran along the east bank of the Schuylkill River and under the bridge. Furness mixed Flemish Revival detailing with an industrial aesthetic of brick, iron and glass. Through the station's innovative plan, he separated the flow of passengers waiting to board the trains from those arriving. Directly south of the passenger station stretched a brick baggage and freight building.

The station building was expanded in 1912, and its interior was remodeled in 1943. The Chestnut Street entrance porch was replaced in the 1940s.

Furness's architectural drawings are at the Historical Society of Pennsylvania.

Philadelphia Model Railroad Club
The B&O Station building was also home to the Philadelphia Model Railroad Club, which split into two separate clubs when the building was torn down. The first reopened as the Cherry Valley Model Railroad Club in Merchantville, New Jersey in 1962, and the second as the East Penn Traction Club several years later. Some of the models and buildings from the PMRC were salvaged, and live on today on the CVMRR layout.

Demolition
The Philadelphia B & O station saw its last regularly scheduled passenger train on April 28, 1958, when the Baltimore & Ohio Railroad ended all passenger service north of Baltimore. The station suffered a fire in 1963, and was demolished.

Mural Arts Program

As part of the city's Mural Arts Program, a mural commemorating the station has been executed on the side of 2300 Chestnut Street, across from where the station stood.

See also

 30th Street Station
 Broad Street Station (Philadelphia)
 Reading Terminal
 Suburban Station
 List of National Historic Landmarks in Philadelphia

References

External links

image gallery of the station
Baltimore and Ohio Rail Road Station From Walnut Street Wharf Schuylkill River, June 29, 1889 by D. J. Kennedy, Historical Society of Pennsylvania

Philadelphia 24th
Historic American Buildings Survey in Philadelphia
Railway stations in the United States opened in 1888
Railway stations closed in 1958
Frank Furness buildings
Buildings and structures demolished in 1963
Demolished railway stations in the United States
Demolished buildings and structures in Philadelphia
1888 establishments in Pennsylvania
1958 disestablishments in Pennsylvania
Former railway stations in Philadelphia